Towanda-Grantley is a neighborhood in northwest Baltimore which predominantly consists of attached residential properties which were built in the 1950s. The neighborhood is often described as part of the greater Park Heights area, and includes the West Cold Spring Metro Subway station at its northwestern edge at the intersection of West Cold Spring Lane and Wabash Avenue.

References 

Neighborhoods in Baltimore
Northwest Baltimore